Sunshine Kitty is the fourth studio album by Swedish singer Tove Lo, released on 20 September 2019 by Island Records. It includes the singles "Glad He's Gone", "Bad as the Boys" featuring Alma, "Jacques" with Jax Jones, "Really Don't Like U" featuring Kylie Minogue and "Sweettalk My Heart".

Background
The album was recorded in Los Angeles and Stockholm, Sweden and was called a "new chapter" for Lo, "marked by reclamation of confidence, hard-earned wisdom, more time, and a budding romance". Lo also said the album title is a "play on pussy power", calling the cartoon cat "an extension of me and part of the new music". Lo also said the songs are "happier" than her previous material, that the album will feature "dirty pop, sad bangers, and badass collabs", and "There's definitely some club bangers on there, but some of it is a bit more acoustic".

Paw Prints Edition 
On 18 May 2020 the Taiwanese audio streaming website corp.com.tw released the tracklist for Sunshine Kitty: Paw Prints Edition. Paw Prints Edition features the same songs as Sunshine Kitty, plus eight more tracks. The lyrics website Genius also released a tracklist for the Paw Prints Edition, featuring the same tracks as on corp.com.tw. Lo also released the cover for the song "Sadder Badder Cooler" on her social media, announced the release date for the song with a special animated snippet of Sunshine Kitty (the lynx present on the album cover) and her animated as Disney characters walking to the rhythm of the song. Lo can be seen walking with a sword on her shoulder and dressed in an unbuttoned jacket, with her hair blue like in the "Bikini Porn" music video. Sunshine Kitty can be seen with sunglasses walking next to Lo. On May 19, Lo announced on her social media that Sunshine Kitty: Paw Prints Edition was going to be released on 22 May 2020.

Promotion

The promotion for Sunshine Kitty unofficially began on 25 May 2019, with Lo posting pictures of doodles to her social media accounts over three days. On 28 May, she posted a short video which introduced the character Sunshine Kitty and contained a snippet of "Glad He's Gone", as well as its release date at the end of the video. Lo also posted a picture of herself in a kitchen along with a lyric from the track before revealing the title and precise time and date of the first single's release. "Glad He's Gone" received three videos: a lyric video, which premiered on the same day as the track, a vertical video, and the official music video. Lo also talked about the album in a few interviews, such as one with Billboard, BUILD Series LDN, and MTV News. "Glad He's Gone" was performed at iHeartRadio, The Late Show with Stephen Colbert, and Szigest Festival 2019, as well as some other festivals and small shows.

On 30 July, Lo posted a teaser of Sunshine Kittys next single, "Bad as the Boys", which included its release date and time. The album's tracklist was revealed in a short video and a photo posted to Lo's social media. On 26 August, Lo teased the release of another song, "Jacques", a collaboration with Jax Jones. The song premiered as the album's third single two days later. The Sunshine Kitty Release Show took place on 19 September at Bowery Ballroom, New York City.

Every song released as a single from the album received a lyric video, while "Glad He's Gone", "Jacques", "Are U Gonna Tell Her?" and "Sweettalk My Heart" received music videos.

Critical reception 

Sunshine Kitty received positive reviews from contemporary music critics. At Metacritic, which assigns a normalized rating out of 100 to reviews from mainstream critics, the album has an average score of 75 based on six reviews, indicating "generally favorable reviews". Aggregator AnyDecentMusic?  gave it 7 out of 10, based on their assessment of the critical consensus. It was rated 72 out of 100 at Album of the Year.

AllMusic's Heather Phares praised the album's musical direction, writing, "As Lo puts her stamp on all of Sunshine Kitty different sounds and emotions, there's a breeziness that hasn't been present in her music since Queen of the Clouds". Hannah Mylrea of NME complimented Lo's use of her already known musical formula, stating that it is "no bad thing: [the album] features some of her best work in years as she boldly embraces new sounds and unusual collaborators". The Arts Desk Thomas H Green praised the album's mature tone and songwriting. Mick Jacobs of Spectrum Culture classified the album as an improvement over the singer's previous ones, highlighting its songwriting. Similarly, Louise Bruton of The Irish Times noted that the album "feel[s] like the light at the end of the drug-fuelled tunnel that she resided in" on her previous releases, while Max Russell of The Young Folks wrote "With the success of her last three moonlit albums, Tove Lo could have continued chasing the night highs, but Sunshine Kitty shines a light on a wiser yet still wild side of her".

Beth Bowles of Exclaim! considered the number of tracks to be large, but stated that "Essentially, every song on this album would bring anyone to their feet". Writing for The Guardian, Laura Snapes criticized Lo's nihilism throughout Sunshine Kitty, stating that it "dominated the latter half of the decade and no longer sounds as fresh as it did". Evening Standard Harry Fletcher wrote that the album's "often forgettable collection of songs doesn’t do justice to Tove Lo’s obvious charisma and lyrical candor".

Year-end rankings

Track listing

Notes
  signifies a co-producer
 "Sweettalk My Heart" is stylized as "Sweettalk my Heart".
 "Are U Gonna Tell Her?" is stylized as "Are U gonna tell her?".
 "Really Don't Like U" and "Anywhere U Go" are stylized in sentence case.
 "Sadder Badder Cooler" is stylized in all lowercase.

Personnel 

 Tove Lo – primary artist, composer, creative director, executive producer, lyricist, vocals
 Samuel Burgess-Johnson – art direction, design
 Tom Fuller – assistant engineer, engineer
 Gustav Weber Vernet;– band/crew member, producer, keyboards
 Rickard Göransson – bass, acoustic guitar
 Jack & Coke – bass, background vocals, beatbox, drums, guitar, keyboards, producer, programmer, programming
 A Strut – bass, background vocals, beatbox, drums, guitar, keyboards, producer, programming
 Mattias Larsson – bass, composer
 Robin Fredriksson – bass, composer, drums, flute, keyboards, percussion, producer, programming, ukulele
 Shellback – bass, composer, guitar, keyboards, percussion, producer, programming
 Mattman – bass, drums, flute, keyboards, percussion, producer, programming, ukulele
 The Struts – bass, composer, drums, keyboards, producer, programming
 Caroline Ailin – composer
 Jakob Hazell – composer
 Jakob Jeristrom – composer
 Max Martin – composer
 Ludvig Söderberg – composer, executive producer, keyboards, programming
 MC Zaac – composer, featured artist
 Timucin Lam – composer, instrumentation
 Mark Ralph – composer, instrumentation, mixing, producer
 Ian Kirkpatrick – composer, instrumentation, producer, programming
 Joel Little – composer, producer
 Umberto Tavares – composer, vocal engineer
 Jefferson Junior – composer, vocal engineer
 Charlie Twaddle – creative director
 Jax Jones – featured artist, producer
 Alma – featured artist, vocals
 Kylie Minogue – featured artist, vocals
 Doja Cat – featured artist, vocals, lyricist
 Harley Jones – illustrations
 Stuart Hawkes – mastering
 Serban Ghenea – mixing
 John Hanes – mixing engineer
 Moni Haworth – photography
 Elvira Anderfjärd;– producer
 Club Ralph – producer, mixing
 Fera DoMar – vocal engineer
 Henrik Michelsen – vocal engineer
 Kalle Keskikuru – vocal engineer
 Yeti Beats – vocal engineer

Charts

References

2019 albums
Tove Lo albums
Island Records albums
Vertically-oriented music videos